The Dallas Defenders were a team in the Premier Basketball League (PBL) which began play in 2008.

The team played at the Alfred J. Loos Fieldhouse, which was also the part-time home to the Dallas Chaparrals of the original American Basketball Association.  The facility is listed as the seventh-biggest primary/secondary school fieldhouse in the United States.

When the 2008-2009 list of PBL teams was released at the PBL website, Dallas was not listed on it and is, therefore, considered folded.

External links
Official Website

Former Premier Basketball League teams
Sports teams in the Dallas–Fort Worth metroplex
2006 establishments in Texas
2008 disestablishments in Texas
Basketball teams established in 2006
Basketball teams disestablished in 2008
Dallas County, Texas